Mario S. De Pillis (January 22, 1926, in Philadelphia, Pennsylvania - November 18, 2021) was an emeritus professor of American Religious history at the University of Massachusetts Amherst.  De Pillis specialized in the history of such groups as the Latter-day Saints and Shakers.  He was the second president of the Mormon History Association who was not a member of The Church of Jesus Christ of Latter-day Saints, any other Latter-day Saint movement church, or a former member of any such church.

De Pillis had a bachelor's and master's degree from the University of Chicago and a Ph.D. from Yale University.

De Pillis and his wife, the former Freda M. Rustemeyer, were the parents of three sons. De Pillis was a Catholic.

Sources

Article by Jan Shipps mentioning some of De Pillis' work

1926 births
2021 deaths
University of Chicago alumni
Yale University alumni
21st-century American historians
American male non-fiction writers
University of Massachusetts Amherst faculty
Educators from Philadelphia
Historians from Pennsylvania
21st-century American male writers